Dražen Janković (1965 – 9 November 2018), also known by his nickname Drale, was a Serbian musician, composer, writer and actor. He was a band member of Sarajevo-based rock band Zabranjeno Pušenje under a pseudonym Seid Mali Karajlić (or Seid Little Karajlić), and Belgrade-based band The No Smoking Orchestra. He was one of the prominent members of the New Primitivism movement in his hometown Sarajevo. His older brother is a Serbian musician and actor Nenad Janković. 

As an actor, he has appeared in television series Top lista nadrealista (1989–1991) and Složna braća (1996), as well as in a documentary film Super 8 Stories (2001), directed by the award-winning Serbian filmmaker Emir Kusturica.

Janković was born in Sarajevo, SR Bosnia and Herzegovina, SFR Yugoslavia (nowadays Bosnia and Herzegovina) where he finished elementary school and the Second Sarajevo Gymnasium. His father Srđan was a linguist and a university professor of Oriental sciences at the University of Sarajevo's Faculty of Philosophy.

Discography 
Albums
 Opomena 1 (2006)
 Objašnjenja (2007)
 Opomena 3 (2010)

Zabranjeno pušenje
 Das ist Walter (1984)
 Dok čekaš sabah sa šejtanom (1985)
 Pozdrav iz zemlje Safari (1987)

Filmography

Publications 
 Privatni semafor: priče, pesme, aforizmi (2007)
 Privatni semafor II (2009)
 Privatni semafor 3: pesme (unknown)
 Privatni semafor 4: pesme (2011)
 Unca unca čudo – Putopis (2011)
 Priča sa ušća Save i Dunava iz Beograda (2016)

References

External links
 Seid Mali Karajlić Discography and Drale Discography on Discogs
  

1965 births
2018 deaths
Aphorists
Bosnia and Herzegovina emigrants to Serbia
Bosnia and Herzegovina musicians
Male actors from Sarajevo
Musicians from Sarajevo
Serbs of Bosnia and Herzegovina
Serbian film score composers
Serbian rock singers
Serbian rock keyboardists
Serbian punk rock musicians
Serbian musicians
Serbian writers
Zabranjeno pušenje members
Yugoslav musicians
Yugoslav Wars refugees
Date of birth missing